Dickinson Dam is a dam in Stark County, North Dakota, one and a half miles west of the town of Dickinson.

The earthen dam was completed by the United States Bureau of Reclamation in May 1950, impounding the Heart River.  The dam has a structural height of 65 feet and is 2275 feet along its crest.  The dam was expanded in 1981, and an auxiliary spillway with bascule gates added.

The dam creates the Dickinson Reservoir, renamed Edward Arthur Patterson Lake in 1959.  The reservoir holds 8612 acre-feet of water, used for agricultural irrigation, flood control, and for Dickinson's municipal needs.  No hydroelectric power is generated here.  The lake covers about 1,190 surface acres and 22 miles of shoreline.  Recreation available at the lake includes camping, fishing and boating.

References 

Dams in North Dakota
Reservoirs in North Dakota
United States Bureau of Reclamation dams
Buildings and structures in Stark County, North Dakota
Bodies of water of Stark County, North Dakota
Dams completed in 1950